Adah is an unincorporated community in German Township, Fayette County in the U.S. state of Pennsylvania.  It is known as a patch town as it was created to support a coal mine.  Adah is the home of the Palmer Mine, one of Henry Clay Frick's holdings. It is also the birthplace of boxer Tommy Karpency, a contender in the light heavyweight division.

References

Unincorporated communities in Fayette County, Pennsylvania
Pennsylvania populated places on the Monongahela River
Unincorporated communities in Pennsylvania